Criscione is a surname. Notable people with the surname include:

Dave Criscione (born 1951), American baseball player
Erminio Criscione (1955–1992), Italian mass murderer

Italian-language surnames